Pretty Rhythm: Dear My Future is an anime television series produced by Tatsunoko Production. It is the second season of Pretty Rhythm and a sequel to the 2011 series, Pretty Rhythm: Aurora Dream, which is based on the Japanese arcade game of the same name by Takara Tomy. The story takes place a few years after Aurora Dream and follows a budding idol, Mia Ageha, as she hopes to become a Prism Star just like the previous protagonist, Aira Harune. The series aired on TV Tokyo from April 7, 2012 to March 30, 2013, replacing Pretty Rhythm: Aurora Dream in its initial timeslot, and was succeeded by Pretty Rhythm: Rainbow Live.

The opening theme songs are "Dear My Future (Mirai no Jibun e)" by Prizmmy for episodes 1-13, "Brand New World" by Prizmmy for episodes 14-26, "Life is Just a Miracle (Ikiteiru tte Subarashii)" by Prizmmy (the voice actresses as their characters), and "Pump it Up!" by Prizmmy. The ending theme songs are "My Transform" by Prizmmy for episodes 1-13, "Check it Love" by Puretty for episodes 14-26, "Body Rock" by Prizmmy, and "Shuwa Shuwa Baby" by Puretty. As a cross-promotion for Avex Entertainment's other groups, "Lolita Strawberry in Summer" by Tokyo Girls' Style and "EZ Do Dance" by Dream5 was featured in episode 11, with both groups making cameos.

Episode list

Pretty Rhythm: Dear My Future

"Charming School With Prism Stone"

In the South Korean dub of the series, "Pretty Rhythm Studio" was replaced by a series of live-action skits titled "Charming School With Prism Stone", which starred the members of Puretty.

References

Pretty Rhythm: Dear My Future
Pretty Rhythm